Anna Perera is a London-born writer.

Life and work 
Anna Perera was born in London to a Sri Lankan father and Irish mother. After teaching English at two schools in London, she took over a unit for adolescents who were excluded from school and later did an MA in Writing For Children at Winchester University. She lives in London and has an adult son.

In 2006, she attended a charity concert for Reprieve.org at the Globe Theatre, where she learned children had also been abducted and rendered to Guantánamo Bay. This event was the inspiration for the critically acclaimed novel, Guantanamo Boy, which has been translated into several languages and nominated for many awards, including shortlisting for the Costa Children's Book Award. Her latest novel, The Glass Collector, tells the story of 15-year-old Aaron and his life in the slums of present-day Cairo.

Books 
 Skew Whiff (1 March 2001) 
 Lolly Woe (22 February 2001)  
 The Night the Lights Went Out (1 May 2006)  
 Guantanamo Boy (5 February 2009)   
 The Glass Collector (8 February 2011)  
 Antarctic Adventures

Personal life 
Anna married David Knopfler in March 1984. They have a grown-up son and divorced in 2010.

References

External links 

 Official Web
  Interview in English on her last two books.
  Guantanamo Boy Facebook page.

English women poets
British children's writers
Living people
Year of birth missing (living people)